Kyan Khojandi (born 29 August 1982) is a French comedian, actor and screenwriter born to a French mother and an Iranian father. He is best known for playing the main character in the television series Bref, which was broadcast on Canal+ from 2011 to 2012.

Life and career 
Kyan Khojandi was born in Reims. His father was Persian and worked as a geologist before fleeing the Iranian Revolution, and later worked in the carpet trade when he arrived in France. His mother is a lawyer, originally from Picardy. He has one brother, Keyvan Khojandi, who plays the role of Kyan's brother in the Bref series.

At 6 years old, Kyan entered the Music conservatory of Reims where he learned to play viola. He then entered the Cours Simon in Paris in 2004 where he studied theatre to become a professional comedian. He wrote his first texts in 2006, then started open stages and played in artists' opening shows.

From March 2008 to February 2010, he appeared in the show La Bande-annonce de ma vie. Yassine Belattar gave him an opportunity to act in his shows Le Belattar Show and On achève bien l'info on France 4, which made him popular. He finalised his solo programme by playing small roles on the Parisian scene.

From 29 August 2011 to 12 July 2012, he played the main character in television series Bref, which was broadcast three times per week at 8.30 pm as part of the French Canal+ show Le grand journal. 

He also appeared in a few ads for French car parts and service station chain Norauto.

Theatre
2011 : Anatole from Kyan Khojandi and Bruno Muschio
2011 : Jamais au bon endroit au bon moment from Greg Romano
2013 : La France a un incroyable talent and Zapping amazing in Paris

Television
2008: Palizzi
2011: Very Bad Blagues
2011-2012: Bref
2012: The Palmashow
2015-2016: Bloqués
2016-2017: Serge le Mytho
2021: LOL: Qui rit sort

Cinema
2013 : Chinese Puzzle directed by Cedric Klapisch
2014 : Lou ! Journal infime by Julien Neel
2014 : Big Hero 6 directed by Chris Williams and Don Hall (French dub)
2015 : Our Futures by Rémi Bezançon
2015 : All Three of Us by Kheiron
2016 : Rosalie Blum directed by Julien Rappeneau
2016 : La folle histoire de Max et Léon directed by Jonathan Barré
2017 : See You Up There directed by Albert Dupontel
2019 : Sweetheart
2020 : The Speech

Music
2014 : Monsieur tout le monde by Bigflo & Oli (as the main character).

References

External links

 

Living people
1982 births
French people of Iranian descent
Actors from Reims
French comedians
French male screenwriters
French screenwriters
French male stage actors
21st-century French male actors
French male film actors
French male television actors
Writers from Reims